Bhavani Island situated in the midst of the Krishna River, at Vijayawada. It has a robotic dinosaur park, garden maze, mirror maze, golf and badminton simulator, cycling, etc.

Etymology 
The Kanaka Durga Temple is the abode of Goddess Durga. She is also known with another name as Bhavani and hence, the island is named Bhavani Island. The island is located in close proximity to the temple.

Tourism developments 

APTDC has taken initiatives to develop the place into a tourist spot. One such initiative is  Shilparamam, an arts and crafts village project. It is also helpful for local artisans such as Kondapalli toy makers, weavers etc. APTDC has developed infrastructure on Bhavani Island to attract many tourists, which include sporting activities, resorts, rural museum, Berm Park, rope-way etc.

References 

Car Rentals in Vijayawada

Islands of Andhra Pradesh
River islands of India
Geography of Krishna district
Tourist attractions in Vijayawada
Islands of India